Enteroplax is a genus of air-breathing land snails, terrestrial pulmonate gastropod mollusks in the family Strobilopsidae.

Species 
The genus Enteroplax includes the following species:
 Enteroplax boholensis (Gude) - from Bohol, Philippines
 Enteroplax kanjiokuboi Minato & Tada, 1992 - from Taiwan
 Enteroplax quadrasi (Möllendorff) - type species, from Luzon, Philippines
 Enteroplax taiwanica Minato & Tada, 1992 - from Taiwan
 Enteroplax trochospira (Möllendorff) - from Cebu, Philippines
 Enteroplax yaeyamensis Habe & Chinen, 1974 - from Yaeyama Islands, Japan

References

Further reading 
  Minato H. (1982). 日本のクチミゾガイ類. "Eostrobilops and Enteroplax from Japan (Strobilopsidae)". 日本貝類学会研究連絡誌 The Chiribotan. CiNii.

External links 

Strobilopsidae